In the first edition of the tournament, Yayuk Basuki won the title by defeating Naoko Sawamatsu 6–2, 6–2 in the final.

Seeds

Draw

Finals

Top half

Bottom half

References

External links
 Official results archive (ITF)
 Official results archuve (WTA)

Singles